Adonias saga is a medieval Icelandic romance saga.

Synopsis

Kalinke and Mitchell summarise the saga thus:

The crux of the tale is the prophecy that the offspring born to the king and queen of Syria will rule the kingdom after the king's death. An evil duke tries to secure the royal throne for his own progeny and turn the prophecy of royal succession to his own advantage. The king is abducted and secreted in the bed of the duke's daughter, while the duke sleeps with the queen. As prophesied, offspring are born to both king and queen. When the king reveals that he knows about the deception practiced on him, he is attacked by the duke and killed. The queen's son, Constancius, ascends the throne. The greater part of the romance relates the attempts of Adonias, the king's son, to gain the
throne of Syria. The romance is characterized by extensive battle accounts.

In the assessment of Otto J. Zitzelsberger, ‘Adonias saga, which runs to seventy-one chapters, is unnecessarily prolongued by its unrelenting account of large-scale military preparations and actions as well as duels and other single encounters. It is also overloaded with stock banquets, hunting scenes, and hyperbole associated with the genre to which it belongs'.

Manuscripts

Kalinke and Mitchell identified the following early manuscripts of the saga:

 Arnamagnæean Institute, Copenhagen: AM 567,4° (vellum fragment), I (15th c), 4 leaves; VI, α (15th c), 2 leaves; VI, β (ca. 1400), 1 leaf
 AM 570a, 4° (late 15th c), vellum, defective
 AM 579, 4° (15th c), vellum, defective
 AM 593a, 4° (15th c), vellum
 AM 118a, 8° (17th c)
 Royal Library, Copenhagen: NKS 1265, fol., II, c (15th c), vellum, 1 leaf
 Royal Library, Stockholm: Perg. fol. nr 7 (late 15th c), defective
 Papp. 4:o nr 6 (late 17th c)
 Papp. 4:o nr 19 (late 17th c )
 Papp. fol. nr 48 (1690), defective

Editions and translations

Agnete Loth (ed.), Late Medieval Icelandic Romances, Editiones Arnamagæanae, series B, 20–24, 5 vols Copenhagen: Munksgaard, 1962–65), III 66-230. [The principal scholarly edition.]

References

Chivalric sagas
Icelandic literature
Old Norse literature